Bokermannohyla oxente is a species of frogs in the family Hylidae. It is endemic to Bahia state, Brazil.

Bokermannohyla oxente is a nocturnal species. These frogs live close to stream in riparian vegetation. Males are territorial and call throughout the year.

References

oxente
Endemic fauna of Brazil
Amphibians of Brazil
Frogs of South America
Amphibians described in 2006